Exodeoxyribonuclease III (EC 3.1.11.2, Escherichia coli exonuclease III, E. coli exonuclease III, endoribonuclease III) is an enzyme that catalyses the following reaction

 Exonucleolytic cleavage in the 3′- to 5′-direction to yield nucleoside 5′-phosphates

This enzyme has a preference for double-stranded DNA.

References

External links 
 

EC 3.1.11